John H. Felt (1867, Indiana – 1938, Missouri) was an architect who designed many churches, schools, and government buildings in Missouri and Kansas.

He was born in Indiana and moved to St. Joseph, Missouri in 1898 where he formed J.H. Felt & Company.

In 1937 he moved to Kansas City where he was senior at the firm Felt, Dunham & Kriehn, and in 1936 following Mr. Dunham's withdrawal, continued under the name of Felt & Kriehn.

Among the buildings he designed are the Administration Buildings at Northwest Missouri State University and Emporia State University and the Boone County, Missouri Courthouse.

In 1904 he became publisher of Modern Architecture magazine.

Buildings on the National Register of Historic Places
Felt has multiple structures in two historic districts, a city hall and two schools on the National Register of Historic Places.

References

1867 births
1938 deaths
People from Indiana
Architects from Missouri
American publishers (people)
People from St. Joseph, Missouri